Gymnopogon (skeletongrass) is a genus of American and Southeast Asian plants in the grass family.

 Species
 Gymnopogon ambiguus (Michx.) Britton, Stern & Poggenb.  - southeastern + south-central United States (NM to NJ); Hispaniola
 Gymnopogon aristiglumis Hitchc. - El Salvador
 Gymnopogon brevifolius Trin. - southeastern + south-central USA (TX to NJ)
 Gymnopogon burchellii (Munro ex Döll) Ekman - Bolivia, Brazil, Argentina, Paraguay, Uruguay
 Gymnopogon chapmanianus Hitchc. - Georgia, Florida
 Gymnopogon delicatulus (C.B.Clarke) Bor - Laos, Myanmar, Thailand, Vietnam
 Gymnopogon doellii Boechat & Valls - Brazil
 Gymnopogon fastigiatus Nees - Costa Rica, Panama, Colombia, Venezuela, Brazil, Bolivia
 Gymnopogon foliosus (Willd.) Nees - Hispaniola, Puerto Rico, Leeward Islands, Colombia, Venezuela, Guianas, Peru, Brazil
 Gymnopogon glaber Caro - Argentina
 Gymnopogon grandiflorus Roseng., B.R.Arrill. & Izag. - Brazil, Argentina, Uruguay, Peru
 Gymnopogon legrandii Roseng., B.R.Arrill. & Izag. - Brazil, Argentina, Uruguay
 Gymnopogon spicatus (Spreng.) Kuntze - from Veracruz to Uruguay including Trinidad
 Gymnopogon toldensis Sulekic & Rúgolo - Argentina

 formerly included
now regarded as better suited to other genera: Chloris Dichaetaria Enteropogon

References

External links 
 Grassbase - The World Online Grass Flora
 

Chloridoideae
Poaceae genera